John Crawford Anderson ( 1848 – 12 November 1930) was a 19th-century Member of Parliament in Otago, New Zealand.

Anderson was born about 1848 at Maori Kaik on Otago Peninsula, the son of Archibald Anderson.

He unsuccessfully contested the Bruce electorate in the  against the incumbent, James Allen.

References

1840s births
1930 deaths
19th-century New Zealand politicians
Members of the New Zealand House of Representatives
New Zealand MPs for South Island electorates
Unsuccessful candidates in the 1899 New Zealand general election